Iacopo Melio (born 28 April 1992) is an Italian politician, journalist, author and human and civil rights activist. In 2017, Melio was named a "European Citizen" by the European Parliament. In 2018, he was awarded Order of Merit of the Italian Republic.

Life 
The son of Claudio, a factory worker, and Barbara, a teacher, Iacopo Melio was born with Escobar syndrome, a rare genetic syndrome for which there is no research for prevention or cure, and uses a wheelchair to get around; he has often joked about his condition, saying for example that he was born "with four wheels to get around because he was born comfortable." He has a younger sister, Costanza, born in 2007.

Activism

He graduated from high school in 2011, then he graduated in political science from the University of Florence in 2020. In 2014, he created an online awareness campaign using the hashtag #Vorreiprendereiltreno, which was internationally successful and involved the singer Lorenzo Baglioni, who sang with Melio the song "Canto Anch'io (No, tu no!)", a cover of Enzo Jannacci's song "Vengo anch'io. No, tu no"; the following year he founded an ONLUS of the same name, of which he was president until 2020.

Journalism
In 2016 he started collaborating with the online newspaper Fanpage.it, in 2019 he started further collaborations with The Post Internazionale and La Repubblica, and in 2021 with Vanity Fair Italia and Next Quotidiano. In the same period of time he has published four books: "Parigi XXI" (Miraggi Edizioni, 2016), an autobiographical novel in prose and poetry; "Faccio salti altissimi" (Mondadori, 2018) an autobiography; "Buonisti" (People, 2019) a semi-serious essay on intolerance and hatred, especially online; "Tutti i fiori che sei" (Rizzoli, 2021), a collection of stories dedicated to his sister. He has also taken part in two TEDx conferences, in 2017 and 2019.

Political activity
On 21 July 2020 he announced his candidacy for the 2020 regional elections in Tuscany in the ranks of the Democratic Party, of which he was the leader in the constituency Florence 1, where on 20–21 September of the same year, with 11,233 votes, the highest number of preferences, he was elected regional councillor.

Honours and awards 

 "European Citizen" award
«For translating the values of solidarity and international cooperation into practice.»
— European Parliament, 22 September 2017
 CILD civil liberties award – Best young Italian activist – Coalizione Italiana Libertà e Diritti Civili, 4 December 2018
 Tuscan communicator of the year
«For having distinguished himself in communicating and disseminating a theme, a message of social relevance, a positive image of the Tuscany Region.»
— Corecom, 7 dicembre 2018
 SuperAbile award – Communication section
«For the incisiveness, originality and constancy with which he carries on, with commitment and passion, the battle for the protection of the rights of people with disabilities.»
— INAIL, 3 December 2021

Works 

 Iacopo Melio, Parigi XXI, Miraggi Edizioni, ISBN 978-88-99815-09-7, OCLC 965350604.
 Iacopo Melio, Faccio salti altissimi: la mia storia oltre le barriere, tra ruote bucate e amori fuori tempo, Mondadori, 2018, ISBN 978-88-04-68602-6, OCLC 1090160945.
 Iacopo Melio, Buonisti, People, 2019, ISBN 978-88-32089-32-5, OCLC 1135876636.
 Iacopo Melio, Tutti i fiori che sei, Rizzoli, 2021, ISBN 978-8817149211.

References

External links 
Official website
 
 
 

Italian politicians
Italian journalists
Italian activists
Human rights activists
Knights of the Order of Merit of the Italian Republic
Living people
1992 births
University of Florence alumni
Democratic Party (Italy) politicians